Giuseppe Caruso, nicknamed "Zi 'Beppe" (Atella, 18 December 1820 - Atella, 1892), was an Italian brigand, the most distinguished of the Lucan banditry. He was, with Giovanni 'Coppa' Fortunato and Ninco Nanco, one of the most ruthless deputies of Carmine Crocco but, after that he was delivered to the Savoy authorities in 1863, he also was one of the responsibles of the suppression of banditry in the Vulture. According to the Crocco's sayings, Caruso killed 124 people in about four years as a fugitive.

Biography

The beginnings of the brigandage

Before becoming a brigand, Caruso was a rural caretaker for the Saraceno noble family of Atella. In April 1861, after having shot at a national guardsmen of his country, he decided to become a brigand to avoid charges and to also avoid being executed by a firing squad. It can be immediately said that because of his cool headed thinking and his endowed leadership, he was able to form a band operating in the Ofantino territory.

Carmino Crocco enrolled his companions and both lead various clashes with the national guard and the Italian army. Caruso under the command of Crocco, actively participated in the conquest of Basilicata and distinguished himself in diverse brigandish operations. On 6 April 1862, the gang clashed near Muro Lucano with regular troops, killing nine soldiers.

Caruso continued his activity as a robber and, on 6 September of the same year with his chief Crocco and another 200 bandits attacked a farm, robbing ten sacks of fodder for the horses, twenty sacks of grain and ten cloths worth twenty ducats. The Atellani brigand was also one of the architects behind the massacre of 15 cavalrymen from Saluzzo and of an additional 21 between Melfi and Lavello. In 1863, along with Crocco, Coppa and Ninco Nanco, he presented himself to General Fontana, with the captains Borgognini and Corona to enter in surrender talks, which eventually were not carried out.

The betrayal 

Caruso, due to friction with Crocco in unclear circumstances, abandoned the gang and, when convinced by Saraceno family, surrendered to General Fontana on 14 September 1863 in Rionero. Imprisoned and interrogated in the Potenza jail, the brigand betrayed his companions revealing to the authorities their strategy and their deals with some local politicians. the renunciation grew even more the hate between them According to Caruso's statements, Crocco tried to kill him in prison by sending him poisoned food.

On 5 October 1863, the Military Tribunal of Potenza condemned him to seven years in prison because his lawyer had asked for a reduced sentence because of his collaboration with the establishment. On 1 March 1864, he received permission from the prefect to leave prison, Caruso, along with De Vico, captain of the Carabinieri of Potenza, seized Crocco and other brigands by surprise. By this time, the ex brigand killed two colleagues, and took a third to a military prison in Rionero.

After the establishment of the military zone of Melfi-Lacedonia and Bovino, Caruso was then assigned to general , with whom he continued his repressive activities against the brigands, thanks to his valuable information. During the search for Crocco, Caruso, a flawless marksman, shot a carbine at a distance of 200 meters, at a brigand with a resemblance to his ex commander, who he hit right in the face and fell to the ground. Approaching the body, he discovered that it was one of his men who was using the same clothing, a trick used to avoid being caught by the authorities.

Last period
On 7 April 1864, the director of prisons of Potenza asked the sovereign for grace for Caruso, as he had made a great contribution in the annihilation of banditry in Vulture. So on 7 November 1864, King Vittorio Emanuele II granted it. Because of his commitment, the ex-brigand received various privileges and was named brigadiere of the forestal guard of Monticchio, at the age of 66. Furthermore, he was conceded the privilege of carrying firearms, for the maintenance of the public order of his country and for personal defense. Caruso died in Atella in 1892, at the age of 72.

Filmography

Giuseppe Caruso appears in the following works:
 They called them...bandits! by Pasquale Squitieri (1999), played by Ennio Coltorti.
 , by Paolo Poeti (2012), played by Massimiliano Dau.

External links

Giuseppe Caruso on brigantaggio.net

People from the Province of Potenza
1820 births
1892 deaths
Italian brigandage